Xu Lei may refer to:
 Xu Lei (ice hockey)
 Xu Lei (footballer)